William Henry "Lone Star" Dietz (August 17, 1884 – July 20, 1964) was an American football player and coach. He served as the head football coach at Washington State University (1915–1917), Purdue University (1921), Louisiana Tech University (1922–1923), University of Wyoming (1924–1926), Haskell Institute—now known as Haskell Indian Nations University (1929–1932), and Albright College (1937–1942). From 1933 to 1934, Dietz served as the head coach for the National Football League's Boston Redskins, where he tallied a mark of 11–11–2. He was inducted into the College Football Hall of Fame as a coach in 2012.

Early life
According to census records and to his birth certificate, he was born William Henry Dietz, or "Willie," on August 17, 1884, in Rice Lake, Wisconsin, at 16 West Humbird Street.  His father William Wallace Dietz, settled in the area in 1871 and was elected county sheriff in 1877. His father married Leanna Ginder in November 1879.

Dietz was an employee of and briefly claimed to attend Oklahoma's Chilocco Indian Agricultural School. He left the school after appearing in one football game for them and did not graduate. He attended Macalester College in Minnesota in 1902 and 1903. Dietz enrolled at the Carlisle Indian School in Pennsylvania beginning in 1907 and was a star player for their football team.

Contested heritage

Dietz's heritage was first contested in 1916 after former neighbors who settled on the Pacific Coast heard he was posing as a Native American. In December 1918 the Federal Bureau of Investigation looked into his heritage after he registered for the draft as a "Non-Citizen Indian" with an allotment. The Bureau found he had taken on the identity of James One Star, an Oglala man of the Pine Ridge Indian Reservation 12 years his senior who had disappeared in Cuba in 1894. Dietz also claimed he was the head of an American film company that produced propaganda films for the war.

Dietz was tried in Spokane, Washington in June 1919 for the first offense. One Star's sister, Sallie Eaglehorse, testified after seeing him for the first time at the trial that Dietz was definitely not her brother. Still, the judge instructed the jury to determine whether Dietz "believed" he was a Native American, not whether it was true. Despite that others had witnessed his birth in the summer of 1884 or had seen him the following day, Dietz's mother Leanna claimed he was the Native American son of her husband who had been switched a week or more after she had a stillbirth. Dietz's acting ability along with his mother's fallacious testimony (to protect him from prison) resulted in a hung jury, but Dietz was immediately re-indicted. The second trial resulted in a sentence of 30 days in the Spokane County Jail after he pleaded "no contest".

Dietz's true heritage remains controversial. Although he is recognized as an "Indian athlete" by Dan Snyder, owner of the Washington Commanders (formerly known as the Washington Redskins), Indian Country Today Media Network ran a series of articles in 2004 exposing Dietz as a white man masquerading as a Native American. In 1988, the National Congress of American Indians attempted to meet and discuss the issue with the team's former owner, Jack Kent Cooke, but Cooke refused a meeting. Researcher Linda Waggoner traced Dietz's heritage in several articles in Indian Country Today Media Network and at a 2013 symposium at the National Museum of the American Indian.

Playing career
Dietz played at the Carlisle Indian Industrial School of Carlisle, Pennsylvania, with teammate Jim Thorpe, under famed coach Pop Warner.

Coaching career
In 1921, Dietz took a coaching position with Purdue University in Indiana. After Angel De Cora died in 1919, he married Doris O. Pottlitzer, a middle-aged local journalist, on January 29, 1922. The week previous to their marriage, Purdue officials fired him for illegal recruiting. In spring 1933, George Preston Marshall, owner of the Boston Braves, hired Dietz to replace Coach Lud Wray. In 1937, the team moved to Washington, D.C.

For the rest of his life, Dietz continued to promote himself as Lone Star Dietz, the son of W. W. and Julia One Star of Pine Ridge. He took on his last coaching job in 1937 for Albright College in Pennsylvania; in 1964, still married to Doris, Dietz died in Reading, Pennsylvania. Later in life, Dietz was an active painter exhibiting his work at Lafayette College with in an exhibit curated by Francis Quirk. He and Doris were so poor that former teammates purchased his headstone. It reads: "William ‘Lone Star’ Dietz
born in South Dakota."

George Preston Marshall, owner and founder of the Boston Braves, sought to rename the franchise in 1933 after leaving the stadium the team had shared with the baseball team of the same name. Marshall was said to have named the Redskins in honor of Dietz, who claimed to be of the Sioux Nation, by analogy with the Red Sox who shared the team's new home, Fenway Park. A 1933 news article quotes Marshall as saying he named the team because of real Indians on the team. However, Marshall is only talking about why he specifically chose Redskins. Dietz was hired before the name change and is cited in many articles and by Marshall as being a reason he kept the Native American theme when changing the team name.

Recognition
Dietz was inducted into the College Football Hall of Fame in 2012.

Nickname

Dietz named himself "Lone Star" after James One Star, the alleged nephew of an Oglala Buffalo Bill Performer sometime after the 1904 St. Louis World's Fair. "Lone Star" and "One Star" are the same name in Oglala.

Personal life
Dietz divorced De Cora in November 1918, charging her with abandonment. It is not clear how much she knew about his identity. She died six days after his indictment. Later in life, Dietz was an active painter, exhibiting his work at Lehigh University with sculptors Joseph Brown and José de Rivera in a 1955 exhibit curated by Francis Quirk.

Head coaching record

College football

NFL

College baseball

References

Further reading
Doctors, Lawyers, Indian Chiefs (2008)  softcover devotes a chapter to Lone Star Dietz
At last, Lone Star in the Hall of Fame (May 22, 2012 by Cougfan.com)

External links
 
 

1884 births
1964 deaths
American football tackles
Albright Lions football coaches
Carlisle Indians football coaches
Carlisle Indians football players
Haskell Indian Nations Fighting Indians football coaches
Louisiana Tech Bulldogs baseball coaches
Louisiana Tech Bulldogs football coaches
Mare Island Marines football coaches
Ole Miss Rebels football coaches
Purdue Boilermakers football coaches
Washington State Cougars football coaches
Wyoming Cowboys football coaches
Boston Redskins head coaches
College Football Hall of Fame inductees
People from Rice Lake, Wisconsin
Coaches of American football from Wisconsin
Players of American football from Wisconsin